were unit code names used by the Imperial Japanese Army (IJA) during World War II. 

Unit Character Codes typically consisted of one character, although some units established in the late stages of the war had two-character codes. Code Numbers were three to five digit long numbers unique to each IJA unit.

For example, the 116th Division was assigned  as its Unit Character Code. The tsūshōgō of some of its subordinate units were: 

 
 Arashi 6213 - 109th Infantry Regiment
 Arashi 6214 - 133rd Infantry Regiment
 Arashi 6222 - 122nd Field Artillery Regiment
 Arashi 6225 - 116th Construction Regiment
 Arashi 6227 - 116th Transport Regiment

Unit 731 is another example of a tsūshōgō.

References 
 War History Office of Japan's Ministry of Defense 戦史叢書　陸海軍年表　付　兵語・用語の解説, (Senshi Sōshō No.102), Tokyo, Asagumo-Shimbun, 1980.

Notes

External links 

兵団文字符一覧 - List of Unit Character Codes as of 1945 (Japanese)

Imperial Japanese Army
Code names